Bürünlü (also, Burunlu) is a village in the Zangilan Rayon, located in the south-west of the country of Azerbaijan.

References 

Populated places in Zangilan District